Autumn Ridge is a neighborhood in southeastern Lexington, Kentucky, United States. Its boundaries are I-75 to the east, Barnard Drive to the south, Todds Road to the west, and Vero Court to the north.

Neighborhood statistics

 Area: 
 Population: 645
 Population density: 3,850 people per square mile
 Median household income: $99,526

References

Neighborhoods in Lexington, Kentucky